Tony Sarre is an Australian filmmaker.

Early life
At age 16, Sarre was told that retinitis pigmentosa, a degenerative eye disease, would send him blind in a year. In addition to his film making efforts, Sarre also notably reached the top four in Australia in tandem cycling and is a black belt in Taekwondo.

Selected filmography

Current activities and future projects
In early 2004, Tony became part of a team involved in developing the Inclusive Filmmaking Project. This project involves a series of workshops designed to enable disabled people to learn about the various aspects of film making, including writing, directing, and cinematography.

Two of Tony's films were recently screened at the inaugural international disability film festival, called The Other Film Festival, which was held in Melbourne in early December, 2004.

Currently, Sarre is working on a script for a short film, which will be the true story of a blind hitchhiker who finds himself stranded at a deserted roadhouse in the middle of the Nullarbor Plain. Baking hot by day and freezing cold at night, the hitchhiker is a castaway in an ocean of desert, with few possessions besides his white cane.

References

Australian film directors
Australian screenwriters
Australian blind people
Year of birth missing (living people)
Living people